Kevin Henderson (born December 3, 1986) is a Canadian former ice hockey player. He played 4 games in the National Hockey League with the Nashville Predators during the 2012–13 season. The rest of his career, which lasted from 2009 to 2019, was mainly spent in the minor leagues and later in Europe.

Playing career
On April 22, 2009,  Henderson was signed as a Undrafted Free Agent out of the Canadian university system by the San Jose Sharks.

After two seasons with the Sharks American Hockey League affiliate, the Worcester Sharks, Henderson was not tendered a new contract. Midway through the 2011–12 season, Henderson was eventually signed by the Cincinnati Cyclones of the ECHL on February 2, 2012. He went scoreless in 2 games before he was loaned on a try-out to the AHL with the Milwaukee Admirals on February 10, 2012.

On July 1, 2012, Henderson was signed to a one-year contract with the Admirals NHL affiliate, the Nashville Predators. With the lockout in effect, Henderson was assigned directly to the Admirals to start the year. In the final stages of the shortened 2012–13 regular season, Henderson received his first NHL recall by the Predators on April 19, 2013. On the same day, Henderson scored his first NHL goal in his debut game for the Predators in a 5-4 overtime defeat against the Chicago Blackhawks.

As an un-signed free agent a month into the 2015–16 season, Henderson agreed to a contract with the Quad City Mallards of the ECHL on November 12, 2015. He played part of the season there before going to Europe, where he spent parts of four seasons before retiring in 2019.

Career statistics

Regular season and playoffs

References

External links
 

1986 births
Living people
Canadian expatriate ice hockey players in England
Canadian expatriate ice hockey players in Slovakia
Canadian ice hockey left wingers
Cincinnati Cyclones (ECHL) players
HK Poprad players
Kitchener Rangers players
Milwaukee Admirals players
Nashville Predators players
New Brunswick Varsity Reds ice hockey players
Nottingham Panthers players
Norfolk Admirals (ECHL) players
Quad City Mallards (ECHL) players
Ice hockey people from Toronto
Texas Stars players
Undrafted National Hockey League players
Worcester Sharks players
Canadian expatriate ice hockey players in the United States
Canadian expatriate ice hockey players in Finland
Canadian expatriate ice hockey players in Denmark